The Bangladesh cricket team toured India in November 2019 to play two Test and three Twenty20 International (T20I) matches. The Test series formed part of the inaugural 2019–2021 ICC World Test Championship. It was the second time that Bangladesh toured India to play a Test series, and the first time that Bangladesh played a T20I series against India in India. The Test series also featured the first day/night match to be played by either side.

Bangladesh's captain, Shakib Al Hasan, was initially selected to lead the team on the tour. However, on 29 October 2019, the International Cricket Council (ICC) banned Shakib from all cricket for two years, with one year suspended, after breaching the ICC's Anti-Corruption Code. Following Shakib's ban, Mominul Haque was named as the team's Test captain and Mahmudullah was named as the captain of the T20I side.

The first match of the tour, the T20I in Delhi, was the 1,000th men's Twenty20 International match to be played. Bangladesh won the match by seven wickets, to record their first ever victory against India in the format. However, India won the next two matches to win the series 2–1. In the third and final match, India's Deepak Chahar took six wickets for seven runs to record the best bowling figures in a T20I match.

India won the Test series 2–0, with both matches finishing inside three days. It was India's twelfth-consecutive Test series win at home, the most by any team at home. It was also India's seventh-consecutive win in Tests, a record for the team, and the seventh-consecutive win under Virat Kohli's captaincy, also a record for India. India's winning margin in the second Test of an innings made them the first team to record four consecutive wins in Test cricket by an innings.

Background
 
In October 2019, several Bangladesh cricketers voiced their concerns to the Bangladesh Cricket Board (BCB) regarding the administration of their domestic cricket, with the possibility of a players' strike. The cricketers had agreed not to take part in any further cricket activity until the issues with the BCB were resolved. In response, the BCB called an emergency meeting with its directors to resolve the situation. Sourav Ganguly, president of the Board of Control for Cricket in India (BCCI) was confident that the tour would go ahead as planned, saying "it's an internal matter, they will sort it out. No, no, they'll come". Two days after announcing the strike, it was called off, following Shakib Al Hasan's meeting with the BCB. The following day, India named their squads for the tour, with Virat Kohli rested for the T20I matches, with Rohit Sharma named as captain in his place.

On 29 October 2019, Shakib Al Hasan was given a two-year ban from cricket by the ICC, with one year suspended, for "failing to report corrupt approaches". The approaches were made during the 2017–18 Bangladesh Tri-Nation Series in January 2018, and the 2018 Indian Premier League. Along with the BCB, Sheikh Hasina, the Prime Minister of Bangladesh, offered her support to Shakib. The BCB said they were "shocked and extremely disappointed", but hoped that he would come back to cricket once the ban ends. As a result, Mominul Haque and Mahmudullah were named as Bangladesh's Test and T20I captains respectively.

Two days before the start of the T20I series, the air quality in Delhi had dropped to hazardous levels, with a public health emergency declared. However, despite the poor air quality, both teams were able to train at the ground. Smog had previously affected the third Test between India and Sri Lanka in December 2017, with several players on both sides falling ill. Sourav Ganguly admitted that the BCCI needs to be a "bit more practical" when scheduling cricket matches in northern India at the end of the year. On the morning of the first T20I match, thirty-two flights were diverted and schools were closed in Delhi, due to the air pollution. India's Ravichandran Ashwin described the conditions in the city as "scary".

Ahead of the start of the tour, the BCCI submitted a request to the BCB for the second Test of the series, at Eden Gardens in Kolkata, to be played as a day/night match. One day after the request was made, the BCB agreed to the day/night Test. It was the first day/night Test played by either team and the first day/night Test to be played in India. The BCCI agreed that the Test match would use the SG pink ball, instead of the Kookaburra ball. India's captain, Virat Kohli, said that the day/night match is "going to be a landmark event for Indian cricket and Indian Test cricket". The Cricket Association of Bengal also made many arrangements to mark the event with the whole city of Kolkata was decorated with pink lights. Ahead of the start of the match, paratroopers were supposed to hand over the balls to both captains, but the plan was cancelled due to a security reason. The Prime Minister of Bangladesh, Sheikh Hasina, and Chief Minister of West Bengal, Mamata Banerjee, rang the ceremonial bell to inaugurate the match.

Squads

Ahead of the tour, Mohammad Saifuddin was ruled out of Bangladesh's T20I squad with a back injury. Bangladesh's Tamim Iqbal opted not to play, due to the birth of his second child, with Imrul Kayes named as his replacement for T20Is. One day before the start of the second Test, Saif Hassan was ruled out of Bangladesh's squad due to a split webbing. Following the close of play on the first day of the second Test, Rishabh Pant was released from India's squad, allowing him to play in the 2019–20 Syed Mushtaq Ali Trophy. K. S. Bharat was also added to India's Test squad, as cover for Wriddhiman Saha.

T20I series

1st T20I

2nd T20I

3rd T20I

Test series

1st Test

2nd Test

Notes

References

External links
 Series home at ESPN Cricinfo

2019 in Indian cricket
2019 in Bangladeshi cricket
International cricket competitions in 2019–20
Bangladeshi cricket tours of India